Saint John-Fundy was a provincial electoral district for the Legislative Assembly of New Brunswick, Canada.

Members of the Legislative Assembly

Election results

References

External links 
Website of the Legislative Assembly of New Brunswick
Map of Saint John-Fundy riding (2010) from Elections NB

New Brunswick provincial electoral districts
Politics of Saint John, New Brunswick